Galyang is a Municipality in Syangja District in Gandaki Province, central Nepal. On 12 March 2017, the government of Nepal implemented the new local administrative structure consisting of 744 local units. With the implementation of this new local administrative structure, VDCs have been replaced with village councils. Galyang is one of these 744 local municipal units. Galyang is created by merging Malunga, Jagatradevi, (1-6,9) Wards of Pakwadi, (1,6-9) Wards of Tindobate, Tulsibhanjyang, Nibuwakharka, Pindikhola, Batuwa & (1-4,7-9) Wards of Pelakot.

Political situation
Galyang is divided into 11 Wards. It is surrounded by Parbat District on the north, Chapakot Municipality & Waling on the east, Kaligandaki and Gulmi District one the west and Palpa District on the south. Jagatradevi is its headquarter.

Population
Galyang is created by merging Malunga, Jagatradevi, (1-6,9) Wards of Pakwadi, (1,6-9) Wards of Tindobate, Tulsibhanjyang, Nibuwakharka, Pindikhola & (1-4,7-9) Wards of Pelakot. The sum population of Galyang, 36,967, is residing in an area of 122.69 km2.

See also

References

Municipalities of Syangja District
Syangja District
Municipalities in Gandaki Province